Lalit Vijay Singh is an Indian politician from Janata Dal. He was the member of 6th Lok Sabha from  Begusarai elected in 1989 Indian General  Elections. He was Union Minister of State, Defence from 21 November 1989 to 25 April 1990 in Chandra Shekhar ministry. He joined Indian Police Service in 1956 and took voluntary retirement in 1989 then joined Janata Dal.  He was Advocate at Patna High Court.

References

1931 births
Year of death missing
India MPs 1989–1991
Janata Dal politicians
Samajwadi Janata Party politicians
Indian police officers
Possibly living people
People from Begusarai
Lok Sabha members from Bihar